Claude E. Carpenter (September 26, 1904 – February 18, 1976) was an American set decorator. He was nominated for three Academy Awards in the category Best Art Direction.

Selected filmography
Carpenter was nominated for three Academy Awards for Best Art Direction:
 Step Lively (1944)
 Experiment Perilous (1944)
 Viva Zapata! (1952)

References

External links

1904 births
1976 deaths
American set decorators
People from Kane County, Utah